Thilachium is a genus of flowering plants belonging to the family Capparaceae.

Its native range is Somalia to Southern Africa, Madagascar, Mauritius.

Species:

Thilachium africanum 
Thilachium angustifolium 
Thilachium densiflorum 
Thilachium humbertii 
Thilachium laurifolium 
Thilachium macrophyllum 
Thilachium monophyllum 
Thilachium panduriforme 
Thilachium paradoxum 
Thilachium pouponii 
Thilachium roseomaculatum 
Thilachium seyrigii 
Thilachium sumangui 
Thilachium thomasii

References

Capparaceae
Brassicales genera